Christians in the Visual Arts (CIVA) is an American visual arts organization working to enhance and explore the relationship between Christian faith and the visual arts. It was founded in 1979.

Gallery instructor Jeremy Hamilton-Arnold describes CIVA's work as "Many of the artists involved [in CIVA] are making art worth showing, sharing, and talking about." It publishes the Seen magazine, and co-curates and co-sponsors traveling art exhibitions.

Contemporary Art and the Church: A Conversation Between Two Worlds, (2017) edited by  W. David O. Taylor and Taylor Worley, is a collection of essays based on the 2015 CIVA conference.

References

External links 
 

Christian art
American artist groups and collectives
Arts organizations established in 1979
1979 establishments in the United States